Deceased (often stylized as DECEASED...) is an American extreme metal band from Virginia. In 1990 they were the first band to sign with Relapse Records, and released four albums and a number of EPs before parting ways with the label in 2003. Their sound centers around themes of horror, with lyrics barked and sometimes narrated by vocalist and founder King Fowley.

History
King Fowley and guitarist Doug Souther started the band in 1984 in Arlington, Virginia with a goal to "out-thrash Slayer". They experimented with a number of band names, formations and styles before settling on the Deceased name and first real lineup in 1986 consisting of Fowley on drums and vocals, Mark Adams joining Souther on guitar, and bassist Rob Sterzel. Tragedy struck the group on March 3, 1988 when Sterzel and several friends, including the brother of guitarist Doug Souther, were killed in a hit-and-run accident. Les Snyder became the bassist later that year. Souther quit and was replaced by Mike Smith in 1991. The lineup of King Fowley, Mike Smith, Mark Adams, and Les Snyder lasted over a decade and recorded some of the group's most celebrated works. Changes began to reshape the band in 2003, when Dave "Scarface" Castillo stepped in as drummer, enabling Fowley to be frontman and vocalist. Mark Adams left in 2007 and was replaced by Shane Fuegal. Mike Smith retired from live performances in 2006, but remains a key songwriter and studio guitarist. Les Snyder relocated to Texas in 2009 and usually performs live for shows close to home.

Since leaving Relapse, Deceased have continuously released new material, including As the Weird Travel On (Thrash Corner Records) in 2005, an independent vinyl-only live album entitled Blood Orgy in College Park - Stalking the Airwaves in 2010, and the more recent LP Surreal Overdose in 2011 on their own Shrieks From the Hearse label in conjunction with PATAC Records. The November 2012 issue of Decibel contained a flexi-disc of an exclusive new track "The Luck of the Corpse". A split 12" with the band Conceived By Hate, titled "The Figure of Uneasiness", was released in the fall of 2014 on El Salvador's Morbid Skull label, featuring four live-in-the-studio recordings with the current live lineup. A new album, entitled Ghostly White, was released in 2018 through Hell's Headbangers Records. Drummer David "Scarface" Castillo sadly drowned in November 2018. The band knew Dave would want them to carry on and found a drummer in friend Amos Rifkin and played live gigs all of 2019 as well as releasing a tribute live recording of one of Dave's last shows with the band called 'Death Metal from the Dave" to honor him. In June 2020 they released Rotten to the Core Part 2 [the Nightmare Continues] an all covers release of old punk/hardcore songs on Malt Soda Records. 2021 saw the band release an all thrash cover songs record called Thrash Times at Ridgemont High on Hells Headbangers Records in October. Their next studio record of new material is being written and is set to be released under the title "Children of the Morgue".

Members
Current members
 King Fowley – vocals (1984-present), bass (1984-1986), drums (1986-2003, 2008-2012) 
 Mike Smith – guitar (1990-present)
 Shane Fuegal – guitar (2007-present)
 Les Syder – bass (1988-present)
 Amos Rifkin – drums (2018-present)

Former members
 Marcel DeSantos – drums (1984–1986)
 Mark Adams – guitar (1984–2007)
 Doug Souther – guitar (1984–1990)
 Rob Sterzel – bass (1986–1988; died 1988)
 David Castillo – drums (2003–2008, 2012–2018; died 2018)

Timeline

Discography

Demos
 The Evil Side of Religion (1986)
 Birth by Radiation (1988)
 Nuclear Exorcist (1989)
 One Night in the Cemetery (1989)
 Live with the Legions (1992)
 Demo I 1995 (1995)
 Demo II 1995 (1995)

Studio albums
 Luck of the Corpse (1991)
 The Blueprints for Madness (1995)
 Fearless Undead Machines (1997)
 Supernatural Addiction (2000)
 Rotten to the Core (2004)
 As the Weird Travel On (2005)
 Surreal Overdose (2011)
 Ghostly White (2018)
 Rotten to the Core Part 2 [The Nightmare Continues] (2020)
 Thrash Times at Ridgemont High (2021)
 Children of the Morgue (Upcoming)

EPs
 Gut Wrench (1991)
 13 Frightened Souls (1993)
 Behind the Mourner's Veil (2001)
 Inject the Ugliness (2007)

Live albums
 Up the Tombstones!!! Live 2000 (2002)
 Blood Orgy in College Park - Stalking the Airwaves!!! (2010)
 The Figure of Uneasiness (2014)
 Death Metal from the Dave (2019)

Compilations
 Death Metal from the Grave (1996) - Compilation of demo and live tracks
 The Radiation Years (2002) - Compilation of demo tracks
 Zombie Hymns (2002) - Compilation of cover songs
 Corpses, Souls & Other Strangeness (2003) - Featuring Luck of the Corpse, 13 Frightened Souls and bonus tracks
 Return to the Evil Side (2004) - Compilation of demo and live tracks
 Legions of Arrggghhhh - Compilation of demo and live tracks
 Night of the Deceased (2009) - Compilation of studio tracks included free with the March 2009 issue of Hard Rocker Magazine
  Worship the Coffin (2009) - Compilation of demo tracks
 Cadaver Traditions (2015) - Compilation of cover songs
 Demos from the Grave (2015) - Compilation of demo tracks

Compilation appearances

References

External links
Official website
Deceased interview at Diabolical Conquest webzine
[ Deceased] at AllMusic

American death metal musical groups
American thrash metal musical groups
Heavy metal musical groups from Virginia
Relapse Records artists
Musical groups established in 1984
Heavy metal musical groups from Washington, D.C.